Makan may refer to:
Makan (TV series), a Pakistani TV drama series
Makan (name)
Makan 33, an Israeli television channel
Makan Map, an online atlas of Xinjiang
Makan, Iran, a village

See also
 Maken (disambiguation)
 Makkan (disambiguation)
 Macan, a surname
 Maccan, a community in Canada
 Mackan, a townland in Ireland